Florida Constitutional Convention of 1838 was convened on December 3, 1838 to fulfill the requirement for a United States territory being admitted to the union as a state. An act was passed by the Florida Territorial Council in 1838, and approved by Governor Richard Keith Call, calling for the election of delegates in October 1838 to a convention to be held at St. Joseph, Florida.

The delegates were to draft a constitution and bill of rights for the Territory of Florida. The Constitutional Convention convened with Robert R. Reid presiding as president and Joshua Knowles secretary. The work of the Convention was carried out by eighteen committees, whose members were familiar with that particular area of government. The process was a relatively simple one, since they used the constitutions of several other Southern states as models. Only on the subject of banking did much debate take place. The Convention adjourned sine die on January 11, 1839.

A handwritten copy of the 1838 Constitution or "Form of Government for the People of Florida," signed by Convention President, Robert Raymond Reid, and Convention Secretary, Joshua Knowles resides at the State Archives of Florida. Considered "a secretary's copy" this document is the only known copy of the 1838 Constitution. The original Constitution, signed by all the delegates, has never been found. The preamble to the Constitution of 1838:

Delegates 
This is a list of delegates to the Florida Constitutional Convention held in St. Joseph, Florida, 1838—1839:

Richard C. Allen, Calhoun County
Walker Anderson, Escambia County
Thomas Baltzell, Jackson County
C. E. Bartlett, Franklin County
Abraham Bellamy, Jefferson County
Samuel C. Bellamy, Jackson County
Edmund Bird, Alachua County
Thomas M. Blount, Escambia County
Wilson Brooks, Columbia County
Thomas Brown, Leon County
Joseph B. Browne, Monroe County
Edward C. Cabell, Jefferson County
John G. Cooper Nassau County
Alexander W. Crichton, Duval County
William P. Duval, Calhoun County
Richard Fitzpatrick, Dade County
Isaac Garasson, Alachua County
Samuel Y. Garey, Duval County
William Haddock, Nassau County
William B. Hooker, Hamilton County
John M. G. Hunter, Gadsden County
Edwin T. Jenckes, St. Johns County
David Levy Yulee St. Johns, County
Richard H. Long, Jackson County
John W. Malone, Gadsden County
William Marvin, Monroe County
Banks Meacham, Gadsden County
Richard J. Mays, Madison County
Joseph McCants, Jefferson County
Daniel G. McLean, Walton County
George E. McClellan, Columbia County
John C. McGehee, Madison County
John L. McKinnon Walton County
Jackson Morton, Escambia County
Samuel Parkhill, Leon County
John M. Partridge Jefferson County
Leigh Read, Leon County
Robert R. Reid, St. Johns County
Stephen J. Roche, Washington County
E. Robbins, Washington County
Jose S. Sanchez St. Johns County
Albert G. Semmes, Franklin County
Samuel B. Stephens, Gadsden County
John Taylor, Leon County
Leslie A. Thompson, Leon County
George Taliaferro Ward, Leon County
Joseph B. Watts, Hamilton County
John F. Webb, Columbia County
James D. Westcott, Leon County
E. K. White, Alachua County
William H. Williams, Mosquito County
Alfred L. Woodward, Jackson County
Oliver Woods, Duval County
Benjamin D. Wright, Escambia County
William Wyatt, Leon County

See also
 Constitution of Florida
 Florida Constitutional Convention of 1885

References

1838 in Florida
American constitutional conventions
Florida law
Government of Florida
Legal history of Florida
Florida Constitution Delegates
Defunct state constitutions of the United States

fr:Constitution de la Floride